The 1970 PGA Championship was the 52nd PGA Championship, played August 13–16 at Southern Hills Country Club in Tulsa, Oklahoma. Dave Stockton won the first of his two PGA Championships at 279 (−1), two strokes ahead of runners-up Bob Murphy and Arnold Palmer.

It was Palmer's third runner-up finish at the only major he never won, and was his last time in contention in the final round of a PGA Championship. Stockton won his second PGA Championship six years later in 1976.

The third round was played in  heat, and Stockton led by three strokes after 54 holes at 206 (−4). Defending champion Raymond Floyd carded a 65 (−5) on Saturday and was in second place at 209 (−1) entering the final round, and Palmer was alone in third place at 211 (+1).

It was the second major championship at Southern Hills, which hosted the U.S. Open in 1958. It later hosted the U.S. Open in 1977 and 2001 and the PGA Championship in 1982, 1994, 2007, and 2022.

Course layout

Past champions in the field

Made the cut

Missed the cut

Source:

Round summaries

First round
Thursday, August 13, 1970

Source:

Second round
Friday, August 14, 1970

Source:

Third round
Saturday, August 15, 1970

Source:

Final round
Sunday, August 16, 1970

Source:

References

External links
PGA Media Guide 2012
PGA.com – 1970 PGA Championship
Southern Hills Country Club official site

PGA Championship
Golf in Oklahoma
Sports in Tulsa, Oklahoma
PGA Championship
PGA Championship
PGA Championship